The Fujifilm X30 is an advanced digital compact camera announced by Fujifilm on August 26, 2014. It succeeds the Fujifilm X20 whose 12 megapixel X-Trans CMOS sensor it shares. The X30 abolishes the tunnel optical viewfinder of the X20 and offers an electronic viewfinder instead. In terms of more advanced compact cameras, it occupies the middle ground between the Canon PowerShot G16 and Nikon Coolpix P7800 on the one hand, and Sony RX100 series and Canon PowerShot G1 X series on the other. In terms of Fujifilm's own product line, it is positioned as a more compact and affordable model than the Fujifilm X100S, which has a larger APS-C sized sensor that records 16 megapixels.

References

External links
Dpreview.com

X30
Live-preview digital cameras
Cameras introduced in 2014